Penelope Shuttle (born 12 May 1947) is a British poet.

Life
Born in Staines, Middlesex, Shuttle left school at 17. She wrote her first novel at the age of 20. She has lived in Falmouth, Cornwall since 1970. She married the poet Peter Redgrove (1932–2003) and they have a daughter, Zoe.  They wrote the prose books The Wise Wound and its sequel, Alchemy for Women.

Shuttle is a founder member of the Falmouth Poetry Group, founded in 1972.

Awards
 1974 Eric Gregory Award
 1995 Glen Rybertt Award
 2007 Cholmondeley Award
 Selected Poems (OUP, 1998) Poetry Book Society Recommendation.

Works

Poetry collections

Fiction

Prose books

References

External links
"The Wolf Interview: Penelope Shuttle", James Byrne, The Wolf, 10
"Penelope Shuttle", The Poetry Archive
"Penelope Shuttle", The British council
"Unsent: New and Selected Poems 1980-2012 by Penelope Shuttle - review", Sean O'Brien, The Guardian, 28 December 2012

1947 births
Living people
English women poets
People from Falmouth, Cornwall
Writers from Cornwall